Antonín Veith, or Weith (3 January 1793, Budweis – 19 December 1853, Liboch) was a Czech patron of the arts, who worked to promote the peaceful coexistence of Czechs and Germans.

Life and work 
His father, Jacob Veith (1758-1833), was a weaver and textile entrepreneur from Wallern, who acquired a large number of estates throughout Bohemia. He spent the year 1817 in England. In 1833, he inherited his father's manor in Liboch, and his estates in Kokořín. 

He was very popular with the local people, opening Czech and German schools, and gathering together a large circle of authors and scholars, for whom he served as a patron. These included the philosopher, Bernard Bolzano, the physician and naturalist, Julius Vincenz von Krombholz, the poets, František Klácel and Josef Václav Frič, the historian, František Palacký, the journalist, Karel Sabina, and the lawyer and politician, .

The painters, Quido Mánes and Josef Navrátil, who decorated the manor with frescoes, and the sculptor, Václav Levý, all worked at Liboch. Levý initially worked for him as a cook, but after displaying his artistic talents, Veith sent him to Prague to study with the sculptor, František Xaver Linn (1802–1848). Later, Veith sent him to Munich to complete his studies with Ludwig Schwanthaler. 

In 1837, he decided to create a monument to the nation's heroes near Tupadly. It would comprise twenty-four statues of notable Czechs and Germans. The statues were commissioned from Schwanthaler, who died when he had finished only eight. Veith never completed the project, due to financial difficulties. After the bankruptcy of his brother, Václav (1787–1852), who was a farmer in Kolin, he took over administration of the family's estates, but was unable to make them profitable and went further into debt. After his death, the estates were inherited by his nephew, Antonín Ladislav Veith (1836–1913), who gradually sold them off.

References

Further reading 
 Jana Kilián, Dějiny Liběchova. Municipality of Liběchov, 2011, pp.103-134 
 "Veith, Anton", from the Biographisches Lexikon des Kaiserthums Oesterreich @ German Wikisource

1793 births
1853 deaths
19th-century Czech businesspeople
Czech patrons of the arts
German Bohemian people
People from České Budějovice